Roline Repelaer van Driel (born 28 July 1984 in Amsterdam) is a rower from the Netherlands. She started rowing as a student, at U.S.R. "Triton" rowing club in Utrecht.

Repelaer van Driel took part in the World Championships of 2006 in the fours finishing fifth in Eton. A year later at the World Championships in Munich she was part of the eights and became 7th. That same year they won the World Rowing Cup event in Amsterdam and became third in both Lucerne and Linz.

She qualified for the 2008 Summer Olympics in Beijing with the Dutch eights forming a team with Femke Dekker, Annemiek de Haan, Nienke Kingma, Annemarieke van Rumpt, Sarah Siegelaar, Marlies Smulders, Helen Tanger and cox Ester Workel, and the team won the silver medal.  At the 2012 Summer Olympics the Dutch women's coxed eight team that van Driel was part of won the bronze medal.

References

1984 births
Living people
Dutch female rowers
Rowers at the 2008 Summer Olympics
Rowers at the 2012 Summer Olympics
Olympic rowers of the Netherlands
Olympic silver medalists for the Netherlands
Rowers from Amsterdam
Olympic medalists in rowing
Olympic bronze medalists for the Netherlands
Medalists at the 2012 Summer Olympics
Medalists at the 2008 Summer Olympics
European Rowing Championships medalists
20th-century Dutch women
20th-century Dutch people
21st-century Dutch women